In the U.S. state of New York, off-track betting on horse racing is offered by five regional, government-owned corporations. As of 2014, the five operators had a total of 89 betting parlors and 5 tele-theaters around the state. They accepted a total of $558 million of bets in 2016.

Operations
Off-track betting is offered by five regional corporations. A sixth OTB corporation, serving New York City, closed down in 2010. Each corporation is a public benefit corporation, run by a board of directors who are appointed by the governments of the participating counties and cities. In addition to New York City, thirteen other counties (Allegany, Delaware, Hamilton, Jefferson, Lewis, Onondaga, Ontario, Otsego, Saratoga, Schoharie, Tompkins, Westchester, and Yates) do not have any OTB parlors.

Each of the OTB corporations accepts wagers at a number of full-service branch locations, at self-service terminals located in restaurants and bars, and by telephone and Internet.

Out of each wager placed through OTB, approximately 77 percent goes into the parimutuel pools for distribution to winning bettors. The remaining amount, known as the "takeout", is retained by the OTB operator. In addition, a surcharge of 5 or 6 percent is deducted from most payouts to winning OTB bettors. From these revenues, payments are made to the state, participating counties and cities, racetracks, and funds to support the racing industry. After the OTB's operating expenses are paid, any remaining profits are disbursed to the state and the participating counties and cities.

History
The New York State Legislature enacted its first off-track betting law in 1970, creating the New York City Off-Track Betting Corporation and allowing other municipalities to establish their own OTB operations. The law was meant to curb illegal bookmakers and provide a revenue source for state and local governments. NYC OTB began taking bets in 1971. The City of Schenectady followed in 1972 with its own OTB operation. The current system of regional OTB corporations was enacted in 1973.

OTB parlors began showing live video feeds of races (referred to as simulcasting) in 1984.

NYC OTB

The New York City Off-Track Betting Corporation covered the five boroughs of New York City. At its peak in the mid-1980s, it had over 150 betting parlors. City mayor Rudy Giuliani attempted to privatize the corporation, and in 2001 the bid was won by Magna Entertainment and Greenwood Racing over a partnership between NYRA and Churchill Downs Incorporated. However, the state legislature never approved the deal, and his successor Michael Bloomberg cancelled the process. The corporation filed for Chapter 9 bankruptcy protection in 2009, by which time it had only 66 parlors. On December 7, 2010, the New York City OTB permanently closed all of its parlors as part of its liquidation.

Regional OTBs

Capital OTB
Capital District Regional Off-Track Betting Corporation covers sixteen counties and the cities of Albany and Schenectady. It has 33 branch locations, including its flagship Clubhouse Race Book in Albany.

Catskill OTB
Catskill Regional Off-Track Betting Corporation covers ten counties in the Catskills and Southern Tier regions. As of 2022, It has ten locations at various bars, pubs and restaurants and two other branches that are currently closed. Also in 2022, Gov. Kathy Hochul released a long-buried report from the Cuomo administration, accusing Catskill OTB of waste, mismanagement and hoarding of broken equipment. The New York State legislature is considering merging Catskill OTB with the more profitable Capital OTB.

Nassau OTB

Nassau Regional Off-Track Betting Corporation, also known as Nassau Downs, covers Nassau County. It has six branch locations, including Race Palace, its flagship teletheater in Plainview. A 2013 law authorizes the corporation to run a casino with up to 1,000 slot machines; instead of opening a casino in Nassau County, that right was licensed to Aqueduct Racetrack to enable an expansion of its Resorts World casino.

Suffolk OTB
Suffolk Regional Off-Track Betting Corporation covers Suffolk County. It operates four branch locations, including its flagship Racing Forum teletheater in Hauppauge. It owns and operates Jake's 58 Hotel and Casino in Islandia, under a law authorizing Suffolk OTB to run a casino with up to 1,000 slot machines.

The corporation was under Chapter 9 bankruptcy protection from 2012 to 2020. Jake's 58 was opened in 2017 by Delaware North under license from Suffolk OTB; it was purchased by the OTB corporation in 2021 for $120 million.

Western OTB
Western Regional Off-Track Betting Corporation covers fifteen counties in Western New York and the cities of Buffalo and Rochester. It has nineteen branch offices, and also owns and operates Batavia Downs racetrack and casino.

See also
 New York Racing Association

References

Sports betting
Horse racing in New York (state)
1971 establishments in New York (state)